So I Ate Myself, Bite by Bite is the fourth full length by Dreamend, a Chicago-based band. It is a companion piece to Dreamend's album, And the Tears Washed Me, Wave After Cowardly Wave.

Track listing
 "Pink Cloud In The Woods" – 6:22
 "Where You Belong" – 3:11
 "Magnesium Light" – 3:02
 "Interlude" – 2:10
 "Repent" – 2:46
 "A Thought" – 2:52
 "Pieces" – 3:53
 "My Old Brittle Bones" – 3:53
 "Aching Silence" – 3:02
 "An Admission" – 10:05

References

2010 albums
Dreamend albums
Graveface Records albums